Bio Pac, Inc. is an American company that sells cleaning products in bulk and refillable containers. Founded in 1991, Bio Pac is 100% family owned and based in Incline Village, NV. The company produces non-toxic cleaners such as laundry and dish liquids which are formulated to be biodegradable and for people who are chemically sensitive. Bio Pac focuses its outreach efforts on sustainability and wilderness preservation. Bio Pac uses recycled and post-consumer materials in its packaging.

History
In 1990 Bio Pac founder Collin Harris was volunteering at a recycling center in Maine and became convinced that there were too many empty cleaning product containers being thrown away. In an effort to reduce the amount of packaging waste, Collin worked to create bulk filling solutions so customers could refill instead of dispose their used  soap containers.

In 1991, Bio Pac was founded, and the first bulk soap filling station appeared at the Belfast Coop in Belfast, Maine. Bio Pac marketed the concept to natural food stores nationwide, and within a few years, Bio Pac products could be found in several hundred stores.

In 1996, Bio Pac acquired the company Oasis Biocompatible Cleaners from Art Ludwig, a well known greywater expert. The Oasis brand continues to be sold in a small number of natural foods stores in the Western United States.

As of early 2011, Bio Pac cleaning products are sold in approximately 600 natural foods stores nationwide. Bio Pac has appeared in news articles about green cleaning products and greywater.

References

External links
 Bio Pac Cleaning Products official website 
 Oasis Biocompatible Cleaners
 Ecology Center - Guide to Greywater-Compatible Cleaning Products
 Belfast COOP
 Art Ludwig - Founder of Oasis Design

Chemical companies of the United States
Cleaning products
Chemical companies established in 1991
1991 establishments in Maine